(July 26, 1965 - ) is a former Japanese AV idol, pink film actress and gravure model who was active in the 1980s and rose to prominence as Nikkatsu's final  from 1985 to 1986. Masaki  starred in three Roman Porno films (two of them written by Oniroku Dan). She also appeared until 1987 in several adult videos mainly focusing on her full-figured body.

Filmography

Nikkatsu

Adult Videos (AV)

References

External links 
 

1965 births
Japanese pornographic film actresses
Japanese gravure idols
Japanese female adult models
Pink film actors
Nikkatsu SM Queens
Living people